Ulubey is a town and district of Ordu Province in the Black Sea region of Turkey,  south of the Black Sea in the Canik Mountains. The Melet River runs through the district. According to the 2000 census, population of the district is 29,227 of which 9,128 live in the town of Ulubey.

Economy
The economy of the district depends mainly on agriculture. Hazelnuts, beekeeping, dairy farming, corn, and kale are the main products. In recent decades the population has declined as people have migrated away to jobs in Turkey's larger cities or abroad, now mainly their grandparents remain.

Villages
The villages of Ulubey district include Akoluk, Akpınar, Aydınlar, Başçardak, Belenyurt, Cevizlik, Çağlayan, Çubuklu, Doğlu, Durakköy, Elmaçukuru, Eymür, Fındıklı, Güvenköy, Güvenyurt, Güzelyurt, Hocaoğlu, Kadıncık, Kalıcak, Kardeşler, Kıranyağmur, Kirazlık, Koşaca, Kumanlar, Kumrulu, Ohtamış, Oyumgürgen, Örenköy, Refahiye, Şahinkaya, Şekeroluk, Şeyhler, Uzunmahmut, Yenisayaca, and Yukarıkızılen.

Notes

References

External links
  District governor's official website
  District municipality's official website
 Road map of Ulubey and environs
 Various images of Ulubey, Ordu

Populated places in Ordu Province
Districts of Ordu Province